Artoria is a genus of spiders in the family Lycosidae. It was first described in 1877 by Thorell. , it contains 32 species.

Species
Artoria comprises the following species:
Artoria albopedipalpis Framenau, 2002
Artoria albopilata (Urquhart, 1893)
Artoria alta Framenau, 2004
Artoria amoena (Roewer, 1960)
Artoria avona Framenau, 2002
Artoria berenice (L. Koch, 1877)
Artoria cingulipes Simon, 1909
Artoria flavimana Simon, 1909
Artoria gloriosa (Rainbow, 1920)
Artoria hebridisiana (Berland, 1938)
Artoria hospita Vink, 2002
Artoria howquaensis Framenau, 2002
Artoria impedita (Simon, 1909)
Artoria ligulacea (Qu, Peng & Yin, 2009)
Artoria lineata (L. Koch, 1877)
Artoria linnaei Framenau, 2008
Artoria lycosimorpha Strand, 1909
Artoria maculatipes (Roewer, 1960)
Artoria mckayi Framenau, 2002
Artoria minima (Berland, 1938)
Artoria palustris Dahl, 1908
Artoria parvula Thorell, 1877
Artoria pruinosa (L. Koch, 1877)
Artoria quadrata Framenau, 2002
Artoria schizocoides Framenau & Hebets, 2007
Artoria segrega Vink, 2002
Artoria separata Vink, 2002
Artoria taeniifera Simon, 1909
Artoria thorelli (Berland, 1929)
Artoria triangularis Framenau, 2002
Artoria ulrichi Framenau, 2002
Artoria victoriensis Framenau, Gotch & Austin, 2006

References

Lycosidae
Araneomorphae genera
Spiders of Australia
Spiders of Asia
Spiders of Africa